Visa is a 1983 Indian Malayalam-language comedy-drama film co-written and directed by Balu Kiriyath. It is based on the short story "Bombayil Oru Madhividhu" by G. Vivekanandan. The film stars Mammootty, Mohanlal, T. R. Omana, and Sathaar. The film has a musical score by Jithin Shyam. Visa was a commercial success at the box office. Mohanlal got a take off as a comedy actor for the first time through this film.

Plot

Cast
Mohanlal as Sunny
Sreenath as Balachandran
Mammootty as Sharif
T. R. Omana
Sathaar
Anuradha (her first solo dance as a mujra dancer)
Bahadoor
Balan K. Nair
Jalaja
Santhakumari
Shanthi Krishna
 P. A. Aziz

Production
Producer N. P. Abu after deciding to adapt G. Vivekanandan's short story "Bombayil Oru Madhividhu" into a film, invited Kabir Ravuthar for directing the film. But Ravuthar left the project due to creative differences and was replaced by Balu Kiriyat with a new theme.

Soundtrack
The music was composed by Jithin Shyam and the lyrics were written by Bichu Thirumala.

References

External links
 

1983 films
1980s Malayalam-language films